A rector of a Dutch university is called a rector magnificus. The following people have been rector magnificus of the Eindhoven University of Technology or its predecessor, the Technische Hogeschool Eindhoven (THE):

Lists of office-holders in the Netherlands
Science-related lists
Eindhoven University of Technology